Greatest Hits is a compilation album by American singer Ginuwine. It was first released by Epic Records on November 21, 2006 in the United States. Completing his contract with the label, the album comprises some of the artist's more popular tracks such as "Pony", "Differences", and "So Anxious", as well as tracks produced by Timbaland and R. Kelly. Greatest Hits was debuted and peaked at number 42 on the US Top R&B/Hip-Hop Albums.

Critical reception

AllMusic editor Andy Kellman found that the album "remains true to its title. The spread from Ginuwine's first five albums, released from 1996 through 2005, is fairly balanced. While another three or four songs could've been added to the program, it'll satisfy anyone with a moderate interest in one of the more successful male R&B vocalists of the late '90s and early 2000s – one who handled the club tracks ("Pony," "Hell Yeah"), ballads ("So Anxious," "Differences," "Stingy"), and midtempo material ("What's So Different") equally well."

Track listing

Notes
 denotes additional producer
 denotes co-producer
Sample credits
 "What's So Different?" contains a sample from "Valleri" as recorded by The Monkees

Charts

Release history

References

External links

2006 greatest hits albums
Ginuwine albums
Albums produced by Timbaland
Albums produced by R. Kelly
Epic Records compilation albums